Musra railway station is a railway station in the Mumbai-Howrah rail zone. It is situated in the Rajnandgaon district of Chhattisgarh state. It lies between Dongargarh and Rajnandgaon junctions.

References 

Railway stations in Rajnandgaon district

Rajnandgaon